Attila Keresztes (18 January 1928 – 27 September 2002) was a Hungarian fencer. He won a gold medal in the team sabre event at the 1956 Summer Olympics. After the 1956 Olympics, he defected and represented the United States at the 1964 Summer Olympics.

References

External links
 

1928 births
2002 deaths
Hungarian male sabre fencers
American male sabre fencers
Olympic fencers of Hungary
Olympic fencers of the United States
Fencers at the 1956 Summer Olympics
Fencers at the 1964 Summer Olympics
Olympic gold medalists for Hungary
Olympic medalists in fencing
Martial artists from Budapest
Defectors to the United States
Hungarian emigrants to the United States
Medalists at the 1956 Summer Olympics